Gregory Kevin Krosnes (September 19, 1967 – July 3, 2018) was an American stage actor, educator, and director. A transplant to Memphis, Krosnes was a prominent member of the Memphis theatre community.

Early life
Born to a military family, Krosnes lived in several locations in the United States and Germany. Krosnes settled in Memphis for a while, where he attended Germantown High School. Krosnes then earned his BA in theatre and media arts from Rhodes College and later his MFA in acting from the University of California, Irvine.

Career
Krosnes made his collegiate theatre debut during his first year at Rhodes College when he acted in the college's production of The Rivals. At Rhodes, Krosnes was also a member of the Rhodes Singers. Krosnes returned to Memphis after earning his master's degree. There, he taught at his alma mater Rhodes College and later at Arlington High School. In 2011, Freed-Hardeman University (Tennessee) awarded Krosnes a post-graduate degree of Master of Education (MED).

Krosnes had a penchant for physical comedy and musical theatre and received an Ostrander award for Best Actor in All My Sons.

Credits

Stage acting
The Rivals
All My Sons as Chris Keller
The Robber Bridegroom as Jamie Lockheart
Big River as Tom Sawyer
Little Shop of Horrors as Mushnik
The Addams Family as Mal Beineke
Mamma Mia! as Bill Austin
On the Razzle
A Perfect Ganesh as The Man
Twilight of the Gods (2012) as Sir Arthur Conan Doyle

Voice acting
The Fisherman and His Soul as Ensemble
Spoon River Anthology as Albert Schirding
The Dead Girl (2007) as Joe Sykes
Roman à Clef (2007) as Gary
Rip Van Winkle (2008) as Rip Van Winkle
The Shepherd of the Clouds (2010) as Giles

Directing
The Queen Bee (2008) with Chatterbox Audio Theater

References

1967 births
2018 deaths
American theatre directors
People from Memphis, Tennessee